Rimush or Rīmu[š], inscribed mri-mu-u[š] on the only variant List of Assyrian kings on which he appears, was the ruler of Assyria or perhaps just the part centered on Ekallatum, a successor to and probably a descendant of Shamshi-Adad I, although the exact relationship is uncertain. He reigned sometime during the middle of the 18th century BC.

Biography

Neither the Khorsabad nor SDAS copies of the Assyrian Kinglist, the only lists whose earliest part is still intact, include any successors of Shamshi-Adad I’s son and heir Ishme-Dagan I, who had been ousted by Hammurabi. The fragmentary list known as KAV 14 (pictured) gives the sequence Shamshi-Adad, Ishme-[Dagān], [Mu]t-Ashkur, then Rimu-˹x˺ before skipping to the 54th ruler, Shu-Ninua. There may be sufficient space to insert a successor to Rimudh (Asinum?) on the end of the line his name is given. As the group falls within a section separated by lines from the rest of the list and the first three are known from other sources to be related as father, son and grandson, it is assumed that the four or five names form a dynasty.

Rimush would appear to be named for the son of the legendary king Sargon of Akkad, perhaps reflecting the extent to which Shamshi-Adad and his successors identified with this ancient prestigious dynasty, although the earlier Rimush was apparently assassinated by his own courtiers “with their seals,” according to a liver-omen of the monumental Bārûtu series, a somewhat ignominious end. The events resulting in the demise of the dynasty are witnessed in only one inscription, that of Puzur-Sin, who boasted of overthrowing the son of Asīnûm, descendant of Šamši-Adad, whose name has not been preserved. This may have been Rīmuš, or if Asīnû followed him, perhaps his grandson. The result was apparently turmoil as a rapid succession of seven usurpers took power, each reigning briefly before being overthrown.

Inscriptions

References

18th-century BC Assyrian kings